RFA Sir Lamorak (L3532) was a temporarily chartered roll-on roll-off ferry of the Royal Fleet Auxiliary. It was procured to fill a gap caused by damage to and loss of Round Table class landing ships during the Falklands War.

Launched in September 1972 as Anu, the ship was acquired by the RFA,  renamed Sir Lamorak, and commissioned on 11 March 1983. Decommissioned on 20 January 1986 and returned to the owners, she was renamed Merchant Trader in 1986. More name changes followed; Mols Trader in 1987, Mads Mols in 1988, Pride of Portsmouth in 1989, Norman Commodore in 1991, and Fjärdvägen in 1995, which she is called to this day.

Amphibious warfare vessels of the Royal Fleet Auxiliary
1972 ships